This is the discography of British rock band Fischer-Z.

Albums

Studio albums

Live albums

Compilation albums

Video albums

EPs

Singles

References

Discographies of British artists
Rock music group discographies
New wave discographies